Burren College of Art is an Irish non-profit independent art college specialising in undergraduate and graduate Fine Art education, located in Ballyvaughan, County Clare, Ireland. The Master of Fine Art programme is accredited by the University of Galway.

About 

The Burren College of Art was founded by Michael Greene and his wife Mary Hawkes Greene in 1993. They renovated a Norman tower house, called Newtown Castle, and its grounds. Buildings were added over time, including a new graduate studio and the largest gallery space in County Clare. 

"The Burren College of Art is a unique experiment in art education, based in a unique rural landscape." 

– Eimear McKeith, Circa MagazineThe college hosted summer classes and study abroad students from the US. It started the first Masters of Fine Art in Ireland in 2003 and the first studio-based PhD in 2007, both conferred by the National University of Ireland, Galway. In 2007 Circa Art Magazine described the college as a "high-standard, third-level art education cheek by jowl with Clare’s grykes and clints".

Academic partners
 University of Galway
 Royal College of Art, London
 The School of the Art Institute of Chicago
 The University of Colorado Denver
 The Minneapolis College of Art and Design

Memberships and affiliations
Association of Independent Colleges of Art and Design
College Art Association
European League of Institutes of the Arts
NAFSA: Association of International Educators
National Association of Schools of Art and Design

References

External links
Official site

Art schools in Ireland
Education in County Clare
Universities and colleges in the Republic of Ireland
Art museums and galleries in the Republic of Ireland